Rent Control (aka Aunt Agatha's Apartment) is a television film starring Melissa Joan Hart and Carmen Electra. It was filmed in April 2001, but premiered on ABC Family in 2005.  It was written and directed by David Eric Brenner.  Outside the United States, it is known as Aunt Agatha's Apartment. The film's budget was $1 million.

Plot
An optimistic couple from Iowa are living in New York City with an elderly aunt while trying to make it as actors.  When the aunt dies, the couple hide her death in order to continue living in her rent-controlled apartment.

Cast
Melissa Joan Hart as Holly Washburn    
Ryan Browning as Calvin   
Andrew Kavovit as Dennis 
Carmen Electra as Audrey
Don Novello as Rico 
Joel Michaely as Peter
Lynne Marie Stewart as Aunt Agatha
Shirley Prestia as Aunt Rose
Ron Perkins as Gene 
Ric Borelli as Sleazy Building Manager
Alan Dale as George 
Richard Livingston as Leonard Lasso
Beege Barkette as Claire Fealy
Earl Schuman as Iggy 
Joseph D. Reitman as Vincent

References

External links
 

2000s English-language films
2005 television films
2005 films
ABC Family original films
film
Regulation in the United States